The Kazakhstan national baseball team is the national baseball team of Kazakhstan. The team represents Kazakhstan in international competitions.

National baseball teams in Asia
Baseball